Ashoknagar Kalyangarh is a city and a municipality in Barasat Sadar subdivision of North 24 Parganas district in the state of West Bengal, India. Ashoknagar is the first discovered oil field in West Bengal and East India. The oil field was discovered in 2018 by ONGC.

Ashoknagar has a heritage of political activism, high-quality education, and culture. Ashoknagar Kalyangarh was planned by Dr. B.C Roy and was later named after the leader Ashoke Kumar Sen . The Congressional leaders Tarun Kanti Ghosh and Keshab Bhattacharjee and the CPI leaders Dr. Sadhan Sen, Bikash Ray Chaudhuri, Nani Kar and Chitta Ranjan Basu were principal architects of Ashoknagar Kalyangarh.

The first social & cultural organisations Janayug Sangskritik Sangstha played a vital role to build a cultural environment in the 70s decade . CPI(ML) Organizer Atmajit Chowdhury, Dramatist Swadesh Munshi, Social Worker Parlay Ghosh, Trapada Bhattacharjee, Gauranga Kar, Biswajit Das were contributed notable works in town's cultural development.

The very first unit in this district of West Bengal State Government Employees Pensioners' Samity was formed in Ashokenagar under the leadership of J.C Kundu which worked towards the safeguarding of the rights of retired employees of the state government. 

The area has two parks, Sanghati Park and Millennium Science Park. There are four English medium schools in Ashoknagar. The area is connected to Kolkata through rail(Bongaon-Sealdah) and road (Jessore Road/NH112/AH1) networks.

Here was the Kalyani Spinning Mill which is now converted into a Textile Park. The city previously had a unit of RIC and a chemical factory; both were closed down by the state government.

History
Under British rule, During the period of World War II, Ashoknagar Kalyanagarh was site of a British Royal Air Force Airbase. The site that became Ashoknagar Kalyanagarh was a RAF airfield known by the name of Baigachi Airfield. Four RAF hangars still stand, the remnants of a bygone era. After World War II, the airfield and hangars went into disuse. After India became independent, Dr. Bidhan Chandra Roy, the then CM of West Bengal, developed the airfield into a planned city. The site was initially known as "Habra Urban Colony". Later, its north-east portion was named "Kalyangarh" and then its south-west portion was named "Ashoknagar".

Geography

Location
It is situated in the World's largest delta, The Ganga-Brahmaputra Delta. The elevation of Ashoknagar Kalyangarh from sea-level is 8 meters. There are many forest, several lakes, some canals and vast green fields in this area. Below the ground of Ashoknagar, there is a huge amount of petroleum (as the ONGC and The Union Minister of Petroleum and Natural Gas, Mr. Dharmendra Pradhan said).

Area overview
The area covered in the map alongside is largely a part of the north Bidyadhari Plain. located in the lower Ganges Delta. The country is flat. It is a little raised above flood level and the highest ground borders the river channels.54.67% of the people of the densely populated area lives in the urban areas and 45.33% lives in the rural  areas.

Note: The map alongside presents some of the notable locations in the subdivision. All places marked in the map are linked in the larger full screen map.

Climate
The climate is tropical — like the rest of the Gangetic West Bengal. The hallmark is the Monsoon — from early June to mid-September. The weather remains dry during the winter (mid-November to mid-February) and humid during summer.

Temperature : 39.5 °C in May(Max) and 10.3 °C in January(Min)

Relative Humidity: Between 55% in March & 98% in July

Rainfall: 31mm(Normal)

Demographics
According to the 2011 Census of India, Ashoknagar Kalyangarh had a total population of 121,592, of which 61,236 (50%) were males and 60,356 (50%) were females. Population in the age range 0-6 years was 9,091. The total number of literate persons in Ashoknagar Kalyangarh was 103,492 (91.99% of the population over 6 years).

As of 2001 India census, Ashoknagar Kalyangarh had a population of 111,475. Males constitute 51% of the population and females 49%. Ashoknagar Kalyangarh has an average literacy rate of 79%, higher than the national average of 59.5%; with 53% of the males and 47% of females literate. 9% of the population is under 6 years of age.

Religion
According to Census of India 2011, Hinduism is the predominant religion in this city, followed by Islam, Christianity, Sikhism, Buddhism, Jainism and others. Out of 1,21,592 people living in Ashoknagar Kalyanagarh; 1,18,163 are Hindus (97.20%), 2,983 are Muslims (2.5%), 195 are Christians (0.16%), 26 are Sikhs (0.02%), 22 are Buddhists (0.01%), 10 are Jains(0.008%), 18 are other religions (0.015%) and 175 (0.14%) did not state their religion.

Administration

Municipality 
Ashokenagar Kalyanagarh Municipality recently installed LED tower lights.

The  municipality has an area of 20.50 km2. and comprises 23 wards.

Police station 
Ashoknagar police station is one of the important police stations in North 24 Parganas district. It has jurisdiction over the Ashokenagar Kalyanagarh municipality area and 8 Gram Panchayats which is part of Habra II CD Block area. Ashoknagar police station covers an area of 174.5 km² and serves a population of 261,312. Palash Chattapadhay is the Inspector in Charge of the PS.

Economy
Predominantly this is a domestic town. People move to capital cities and industrial areas like Kolkata, Kalyani, Barrackpore, etc. to earn their livelihood. Normal markets and business have grown to cater the needs of the citizens of this town. The three main market complexes within this town are Golbazar Market Complex, Kachua Agricultural Market Complex and Building More Super Market Complex. Kalyanagarh Bazar also the important market for the citizens of this town.  Besides, there are several self-help groups, women folks, artisans and craftsmen who are engaged in small scale production of jewellery boxes, garments and different kinds of decorative items.

Ashoknagar Oil Field

See more : ONGC - Ashoknagar Oil Field

Education
The city has a very high literacy rate, 92.45%, according to the 2011 census. There are high schools for girls and boys, as well as a large number of primary schools (government and private).

Cinema Halls and Auditoriums
Nataraj Cinema Hall
Saheed Sadan

Culture 
This city can be considered one of the cultural hubs of West Bengal.
Renowned theatre groups like Ajantrik, Avijatri, Annesha, Nattya Mukh, Bhnuiphnor, Ashoknagar Bratyajon and Aaharnish are based out of this town. These groups organize theatre festivals throughout the year mostly during the winter season. These festivals allow the culturally rich people from the city, nearby towns and villages to witness the great performances from different theatre groups from all over the state, different states and even groups from across the border of Bangladesh. The name of the city's main theater hall is 'Saheed Sadan'. Which is one of the biggest auditorium in the district.

Tourist Spots 
 Millennium Science Park (সহস্রাব্দ বিজ্ঞান উদ্যান)
 Sanhati Park (সংহতি পার্ক)
 19 no. Forest (উনিশ নম্বর ফরেস্ট)
 Uttar Kochua Khalpar (উত্তর কচুয়া খালপাড়)
 Hijlia Khalpar (হিজলিয়া খালপাড়)
 Mena Kalvert (মেনা কালভার্ট)

Bank/Financial Institutions
State Bank of India
Union Bank of India
Punjab National Bank
Bank of India
UCO Bank
Indian Bank
Axis Bank
Life Insurance Corporation of India
Muthoot Finance
Bangiya Gramin Vikash Bank
Bandhan Bank

Medical facilities

Hospital
Ashoknagar State General Hospital 
Pragyanananda Saraswati Sebasadan
Pragyanananda Saraswati Sebasadan (Eye Department)
Ashoknagar Veterinary Hospital

Nursing Homes
Blue Print Nursing Home
Happy Life Nursing Home
P Three Nursing Home

Transport

Railway System
It is part of the Kolkata Suburban Railway system. Ashoknagar Road (ASKR) is directly connected on NH 112 (Jessore Road / old NH 35/AH1).

Road
Buses from Habra Bus Terminal are directly connected to Naihati, Maslandapur, Madhyamgram, Bangaon, Barasat, Haringhata, Kalyani, Basirhat, Kolkata, Bagdah, Chakdaha, Bagjola, Digha, Durgapur, Bandel, Baruipur, Howrah, Badkulla, krishnanagar, Barasat, Alampur, Dattaphulia, Nimta, Sodepur, Duttapukur, Thakurnagar, Jaguli.
Ashoknagar Bypass Road is directly connected on NH 112 (Jessore Road) or Asian Highway 1 (AH1) & NH 12 (old NH 34).

The NH 112 (Old NH 35) - commonly known as Jessore Road, comes from Belgachia Road (Nani Kar Sarani) - also known as Habra-Ashoknagar Bypass, passes through the town in the direction of Bangladesh and the border town Bongaon, which is approximately 38 km from Ashoknagar.
The NH 112 (Old NH 35) is a part of Asian Highway 1 (AH 1) which goes from Tokyo to Istanbul.

The town is well connected by road and railway to Kolkata. It is also connected to Naihati and the Habra Jirat Road.

The town is very planned; it is divided into 23 municipal wards. The town was originally planned as a township to accommodate the refugees that flooded India after India was partitioned. It contains housing plots under several schemes (areas or regions in the town).

Festivals
Major festivals observed at Ashoknagar include Durga puja, Laxmi puja, Saraswati puja, Manasa puja, Shitala puja, Ratha yatra, Bishwakarma puja, Shivratri and Diwali. Ashoknagar is known for big Durga Pujas as well as the Kali Puja venues. Bharati and Pally Durga puja is the best known Durga puja at Ashoknagar.  But Kalyangarh region is well known for its Jagadhatri Puja.

Sports 
Dr. Bidhanchandra Roy Kriyangan or commonly known as '3no. Stadium' (৩ নম্বর স্টেডিয়াম) is the main sports ground which is facilated with two galleries for the crowd to sit. The "Ashoknagar Sports Association (ASA)" serve as its governing body. They organise cricket and football matches. Several prominent players have emerged from this region of different games, who have made the country proud.
Two swimming pools and well-equipped gymnasium "Sutanu" here. With the help of government, many clubs have modern facilities for bodybuilding. There are also training camps for Athletes and Karate.

See also
 Ashoknagar Oil Field

References

External links
 

Cities and towns in North 24 Parganas district